Chorizandra enodis, commonly known as black bristle rush or black bristle sedge, is a sedge of the family Cyperaceae that is native to Australia.

The monoecious and rhizomatous perennial sedge has a loosely clumped tufted habit. The plant blooms between July to November producing purple-brown-black flowers.

Floral bracts have white hairs on the tip and red hairs along the margin.

In Western Australia it is found in swampy and seepage areas along the coast of the Mid West, Wheatbelt, South West, Great Southern and Goldfields-Esperance regions where it grows in lateritic sandy-clay soils.

References

Plants described in 1846
Flora of Western Australia
Flora of South Australia
Flora of Victoria (Australia)
enodis